Argyronisos (Greek: Αργυρόνησος - "silver island") is a privately owned island in the Aegean Sea. The island lies between  Kanatadika on Euboea and the mainland near Achilleio, Magnesia. Administratively, it is part of the municipality Almyros. It is 240,000 metres large. The most prominent landmark on the island is the lighthouse built in 1899.

Notes

Uninhabited islands of Greece
Landforms of Magnesia (regional unit)
Islands of Thessaly
Islands of Greece
Private islands of Greece